Coquette is a 1929 American pre-Code drama film, starring Mary Pickford. The film was a box office success. For her role, Pickford won the second Academy Award for Best Actress.

Plot
Norma Besant, daughter of a Southern doctor, is an incorrigible flirt and has many suitors. Her father Dr. Besant (John St. Polis) favors Stanley (Matt Moore), who is taken with Norma. However Norma has met a simple man named Michael Jeffrey (Johnny Mack Brown) who she has fallen madly in love with. Dr. Besant disapproves of Michael and orders Norma to never see him again. Norma gives him their word, then promptly plans to marry Michael in 6 months, when he's made 'good in the hills' so he can buy her a home in the valley.

A few months pass and Michael sneaks down from the hills to see Norma at a Country Club dance. Wanting more time alone they sneak off to Michael's mother's cabin. According to Norma they made coffee and talked all night about the future. She returns home the next day at 4am. However someone has spotted the couple and begun to spread rumors around town destroying Norma's reputation. Michael is furious and vows he will ask her father for her hand in marriage immediately.

Dr. Besant is furious and a heated verbal exchange takes place with Michael leaving, vowing to run away with Norma as soon as possible. Dr. Besant orders Norma to her room and leaves, pistol in hand. As Norma's brother tries to distract her Stanley arrives, telling Norma that Michael was fatally wounded by her father.

Norma runs to Michael's cabin where he dies in her arms. Dr. Besant's lawyer friend arrives begging Norma to lie to the police to save her father's life. Norma refuses, but later as the trial wears on she changes her mind. She takes the stand and lies about Michael, trying to save her father. Norma breaks down under cross examination and her father comes to comfort her on the witness stand. As he tells her she does not have to lie anymore, he spots the gun on the evidence table.

After comforting Norma, Dr. Besant approaches the bench and confesses his guilt, saying he has done wrong and is willing to pay the price. He then takes the gun and kills himself in front of the court. Later we see Stanley waiting for Norma, who has been in the judge's chambers. He offers to walk her home, but Norma refuses, saying she would like to walk home alone.

Cast
 Mary Pickford as Norma Besant
 Johnny Mack Brown as Michael Jeffery
 Matt Moore as Stanley Wentworth
 John St. Polis as Dr. John Besant
 William Janney as Jimmy Besant
 Henry Kolker as Jasper Carter
 George Irving as Robert Wentworth
 Louise Beavers as Julia

Production background 
The film stars silent star Mary Pickford in her first talkie, Johnny Mack Brown in one of his earliest roles, John St. Polis, Matt Moore (Pickford's ex brother in law), and Louise Beavers.

The film was adapted for the screen by John Grey, Allen McNeil and Sam Taylor from the play by George Abbott and Ann Preston Bridgers, and was directed by Sam Taylor. The play was based on real events in Richmond County, North Carolina and some dialog was used verbatim from court testimony. The play originally opened in New York City on November 8, 1927, with Helen Hayes in the title role.

Though a product of pre-Code Hollywood, the film was severely censored during scripting. In the play, the leading lady is pregnant and the story hinges on the fact that she carries the child of the man killed by her father. Her father murdered the man because he asked to marry the girl. But to save her father from disgrace when her pregnancy becomes apparent, she preemptively kills herself. Wrote Ernst and Lorentz, "the censor conscious producer would not allow the movie to show the girl enceinte, thus destroying the whole plot."

William Cameron Menzies provided set decoration, or production design, with the film crediting him for "settings". Cinematography was by Karl Struss.

The song "Coquette", written by Johnny Green and Carmen Lombardo, has since become a jazz standard.

Place in Pickford's career
Pickford had been one of the most popular stars in silent film. Her popularity had been steady since her debut in 1909. In 1916, she founded her own production company, taking control of every detail of her films. In 1919 along with Charlie Chaplin, her husband Douglas Fairbanks, and D. W. Griffith she founded United Artists, giving her complete control over her films.

Known for little-girl type roles such as Pollyanna (one of her highest-grossing films ever) Pickford had been trying to escape typecasting since 1923 with roles such as Rosita. However these films did not do as well as her child roles (though they were still successful at the box office), and Pickford had reverted to making films like Little Annie Rooney in 1925 and Sparrows in 1926. She tried an older role with her final silent film, My Best Girl in 1927 and, following the death of her mother in 1928, cut off her world-famous curls.

With the arrival of talkies Pickford immediately took to the new medium, being one of the first major stars to do so. At her Pickfair Studios she installed a sound stage in 1928, and began preparing for her first talkie. She bought the rights to Coquette, a play that Helen Hayes had made popular on the stage. Coquette is the story of a flirtatious southern girl who chooses to stand behind her father after he kills the man that she loves. Much like My Best Girl the role was adult, with Pickford portraying a flapper type for the first time. Sound technology was extremely touchy at the time, with footsteps or rattling jewelry ruining takes. Cameras could barely move, and were hidden behind glass so as to not interfere with the sound recording. Pickford employed the best technology possible, resulting in a film that had more natural movement and acting than other early talkies.

Despite Pickford's embrace of the new medium it seems she was as concerned as everyone else about how her voice would record, despite the fact she had a stage career before entering film. After reviewing her first sound test she reportedly remarked, "Why that sounds like a little pipsqueak voice!" She immediately began intensive vocal lessons, hoping to accomplish a realistic Southern accent for the role.

Pickford became nervous during preparation, firing her sound man when a take wasn't ready for her review on time. On set during an emotional scene, she notoriously fired her longtime cameraman and friend, Charles Rosher, when he yelled "Cut!" in the middle of one of her lines. She didn't know at the time that a shadow had fallen across her face, as she was simply annoyed at being interrupted. Slightly embarrassed by her behavior and realizing she had been wrong, she wrote him a letter saying, "Tragedy is an ugly mask. I don't want to look like something on a candy box or a valentine."

Release

The film premiered in New York on April 5, 1929, at the Rivoli Theatre. A fuse blew rendering the film silent. It was rewound and shown again, this time with intermittent, bad sound. Finally technicians were able to fix the problem and the film began again for a third time.

Contemporary reviews were polite and warm. It was a box office success grossing $1.4 million. Coquette launched Pickford as a competent talkie star.

Complete prints of the film still exist. In the 1990s it was restored by the Library of Congress and The Mary Pickford Institute. Pickford's estate no longer owns the rights as MGM (ironically parent company of UA) bought the film for a never-made remake. Coquette was released on home video by MGM/UA Home Video in the 1990s. It is one of two United Artists' films, which owned by Turner Entertainment as part of MGM's pre-1986 library and currently distributed by Warner Bros., and has now been released on DVD via Warner Archive Collection.

Accolades 
Pickford was a founding member of the Academy of Motion Picture Arts and Sciences, of which her husband would be the first president. She was one of only three female founding members.

The first Academy Awards were held in 1929, without any nominations for Pickford. She was nominated for Best Actress in 1930 for the 2nd Academy Awards. Many have accused Pickford of unfairly winning, using her clout and standing in the industry for an award of which she was unworthy. 
Pickford did lobby hard for the Oscar, inviting the judges over for tea at her home Pickfair. However her performance was critically and publicly acclaimed. Pickford would receive another Oscar in 1976, an honorary lifetime achievement award.

In 2008, a legal battle ensued between The  and Buddy Rogers' heirs over the sale of the Coquette Oscar. The heirs were trying to sell the award for charity, as stipulated in Rogers's second wife's will. The  insisted that the Award must be offered back to them for $1, to comply with a rule made long after Pickford won her Oscar. They claimed that when she won her honorary Oscar in the 1970s she signed a contract covering the Coquette statuette as well. The heirs argued that it might not have even been her signature, as Pickford was frail at the end of her life.

The  won the legal battle, but announced they were willing to pursue a private agreement with the heirs. The outcome of this agreement is unknown.

See also 
 1929 in film
 List of films with the most Academy Awards per ceremony

References 

Notes

Bibliography

External links

 
 
 
 
 Coquette, virtual-history.com

1929 films
1929 drama films
American black-and-white films
1920s English-language films
American films based on plays
Films directed by Sam Taylor
Films featuring a Best Actress Academy Award-winning performance
Films with screenplays by Sam Taylor (director)
Films set in the Southern United States
United Artists films
1920s American films